Belmont Historic District may refer to:

 Belmont Abbey Historic District, Belmont, North Carolina, listed on the NRHP in North Carolina
 Belmont Historic District (Belmont, North Carolina), listed on the NRHP in North Carolina
 Belmont Historic District (Belmont, Ohio), listed on the NRHP in Ohio
 Belmont–Hillsboro Historic District, Nashville, TN, listed on the NRHP in Tennessee
 Sewall–Belmont House National Historic Site, Washington, DC, listed on the NRHP in Washington, D.C.